Petrizzi is a comune and town in the province of Catanzaro in the Calabria region of Italy. Petrizzi is located in the hills above Soverato. It overlooks the Ionian Sea

 Documentary "Petrizzi - Il fiore di Pietra"

References

https://en.wikipedia.org/wiki/Soverato

Cities and towns in Calabria